Valentin Petrovich Kataev (also spelled Katayev or Kataiev;  – 12 April 1986) was a Russian and Soviet novelist and playwright who managed to create penetrating works discussing post-revolutionary social conditions without running afoul of the demands of official Soviet style. Kataev is credited with suggesting the idea for The Twelve Chairs to his brother Yevgeny Petrov and Ilya Ilf. In return, Kataev insisted that the novel be dedicated to him, in all editions and translations. Kataev's relentless imagination, sensitivity, and originality made him one of the most distinguished Soviet writers.

Life and works
Kataev was born in Odesa (then Russian Empire, now Ukraine) into the family of Pyotr Vasilyevich Kataev, a Court councillor and a teacher at the Odesa Female seminary, and Eugenia Ivanovna Bachei who belonged to a noble family of the Poltava Governorate. Thus it's no coincidence that the main character in Kataev's semi-autobiographical novel A White Sail Gleams is named Pyotr Bachei. His father came from a long line of Russian clergy originally from Vyatka where Valentin's grandfather served as a protoiereus. His maternal grandfather was a major general in the Imperial Russian Army. Despite the obvious class conflict, Kataev never tried to hide his origins during the Soviet period.

He began writing while he was still in gimnaziya (high school). He was then a sympathizer of the Union of the Russian People and wrote nationalistic and anti-Semitic poetry (ironically, later in his life he married a Jewish woman, Esther Brenner (1913-2009)). He did not finish the gimnaziya but volunteered for the army in 1915, serving in the artillery. After the October Revolution he was mobilized into the Red Army, where he fought against General Denikin and served in the Russian Telegraph Agency. In 1920, he became a journalist in Odesa; two years later he moved to Moscow, where he worked on the staff of The Whistle (Gudok), writing humorous pieces under various pseudonyms.

His first novel, The Embezzlers (Rastratchiki, 1926), was printed in the journal Krasnaya Nov. In the satire of the new Soviet bureaucracy in the tradition of Gogol, the protagonists are two bureaucrats "who more or less by instinct or by accident conspire to defraud the Soviet state". The novel was well received, and the seminal modernist theater practitioner Konstantin Stanislavski asked Kataev to adapt it for the stage. It was produced at the world-famous Moscow Art Theatre, opening on 20 April 1928. A cinematic adaptation was filmed in 1931.

His comedy Quadrature of the circle (Kvadratura kruga, 1928) satirizes the effect of the housing shortage on two married couples who share a room.

His novel Time, Forward! (Vremya, vperyod!, 1932) describes workers' attempts to build the huge steel plant at Magnitogorsk in record time. "The title...was taken from a poem by Mayakovsky, and its theme is the speeding up of time in the Soviet Union where the historical development of a century must be completed in ten years." The heroes are described as "being unable to trust such a valuable thing as time, to clocks, mere mechanical devices." Kataev adapted it as a screenplay, which was filmed in 1965.

A White Sail Gleams (Beleyet parus odinoky, 1936) treats the 1905 revolution and the Potemkin uprising from the viewpoint of two Odesa schoolboys. In 1937, Vladimir Legoshin directed a film version, which became a classic children's adventure. Kataev wrote its screenplay and took an active part in the filming process, finding locations and acting as an historical advisor. Many of his contemporaries considered the novel to be a prose poem.

During the 1950s and 1960s Kataev edited the magazine Yunost (Youth), publishing some of the most promising literary talent of the young generation, including Yevgeny Yevtushenko and Bella Akhmadulina.

Kataev himself developed a style he called "lyrical diary," mixing autobiography and fiction. In 1966 the literary magazine Novy Mir printed his The Grass of Oblivion (Trava zabveniya), which was published under the title The Holy Well (Svyatoy kolodets: Trava zabveniya) two years later. In it, Kataev weaves scenes from the lives of his family, friends, and lovers, events of Soviet history, and memories of his travels in America into a kind of stream-of-consciousness autobiography, considered by some critics to be the summary work of his career. Dodona Kiziria describes this work as "a tribute to the Russian writers who were forced to choose their path during the revolution and the civil war", adding that "in all of Soviet literature it would be difficult to find tragic images comparable to the two poets in this narrative (Bunin and Mayakovsky) who are compelled, finally and irrevocably, either to accept or reject the role offered to them by the new social order".

Kataev was proud of being a Soviet writer, and related the following account.

Dodona Kiziria describes Kataev as "one of the most brilliant writers of modern Russia. Of the authors writing in Russian, only Nabokov could be considered a worthy rival in his ability to convey with almost cinematic precision the images of visually perceived reality.

English translations

The Embezzlers (novel), Dial Press, 1929.
Squaring the Circle (play), Samuel French, 1936.
Peace is Where the Tempests Blow (novel), Farrar & Rinehart, 1937.
The Blue Handkerchief (play), University of California Press, 1944.
The Small Farm in the Steppe (novel), Lawrence & Wishart, 1958.
A White Sail Gleams (novel), Foreign Languages Publishing House, Moscow, 1954.
"Our Father Who Art in Heaven" (story), in Great Soviet Short Stories, Dell, 1962.
"The Beautiful Trousers", "The Suicide", "A Goat in the Orchard" and "The Struggle Unto Death" (stories), in The Fatal Eggs and Other Soviet Satire, Macmillan, NY, 1965.
The Grass of Oblivion (memoirs), McGraw-Hill, 1970.
Mosaic of Life (memoirs), The Book Service Ltd, 1976.
"The Sleeper" (story), in The New Soviet Fiction, Abbeville Press, 1989.
Time, Forward! (novel), Northwestern University Press, 1995.

References

Sources

 Benedetti, Jean. 1999. Stanislavski: His Life and Art. Revised edition. Original edition published in 1988. London: Methuen. .
 Brown, Edward J. 1982. Russian Literature Since the Revolution. Revised edition. 101-2, 341-2.
 Kiziria, Dodona. 1985. "Four Demons of Valentin Kataev." Slavic Review 44.4 (Winter): 647-662.
 Merriam-Webster's Encyclopedia of Literature (1995), p. 623
 Seymour-Smith, Martin. 1973. Funk & Wagnalls Guide to Modern World Literature. 951.

External links
Kataev's novel A White Sail Gleams 
Kataev's novel The Cottage in the Steppe 
Full text in English of Kataev's story "Rainbow Flower"
Works 
A short biography 
"Son of the Regiment" (summary) 

1897 births
1986 deaths
20th-century memoirists
20th-century pseudonymous writers
20th-century Russian male writers
20th-century Russian screenwriters
20th-century Russian short story writers
Writers from Odesa
People from Odessky Uyezd
Communist Party of the Soviet Union members
Members of the Supreme Soviet of the Russian Soviet Federative Socialist Republic, 1947–1951
Heroes of Socialist Labour
Stalin Prize winners
Recipients of the Cross of St. George
Recipients of the Order of Friendship of Peoples
Recipients of the Order of Lenin
Recipients of the Order of the Red Banner of Labour
Recipients of the Order of St. Anna, 4th class
Socialist realism writers
Yunost editors
Russian children's writers
Russian humorists
Russian magazine editors
Russian male dramatists and playwrights
Russian male novelists
Russian male poets
Russian male short story writers
Russian male writers
Russian memoirists
Russian military personnel of World War I
Russian screenwriters
Soviet children's writers
Soviet dramatists and playwrights
Soviet magazine editors
Soviet male poets
Soviet male writers
Soviet memoirists
Soviet military personnel of the Russian Civil War
Soviet novelists
Soviet screenwriters
Soviet short story writers
Burials at Novodevichy Cemetery